The 1994 House elections in Georgia occurred on November 8, 1994 to elect the members of the State of Georgia's delegation to the United States House of Representatives. Georgia had eleven seats in the House, apportioned according to the 1990 United States Census.

These elections were held concurrently with the United States Senate elections of 1994, the United States House elections in other states, and various state and local elections.

Despite the fact that Bill Clinton had won Georgia's electoral votes in the Presidential election of 1992 two years prior, Republicans capitalized on the unpopularity of Clinton's and Congressional Democrats' major initiatives, most notably the Clinton health care plan of 1993 and gun control measures as well as miscellaneous disputes regarding social issues to gain three House seats from Democrats. In doing so, Republicans held a majority of the seats of Georgia's delegation to the U.S. House of Representatives for the first time since Reconstruction. Republicans would gain an additional seat when Nathan Deal (GA-9) changed his political affiliation in April 1995.

Overview

Results

References

1994 Georgia (U.S. state) elections
Georgia
1994